Niarada (Salish: Npq'ʷáqs, Kutenai: yaqakxaǂq̓anwuʔkki) is a  census-designated place (CDP) in Flathead and Sanders counties in  Montana, United States. The population was 27 at the 2010 census, down from 50 in 2000.

Geography
Niarada is located at  (47.844532, -114.558638). Montana Highway 28 passes through the CDP, leading east  to Elmo on Flathead Lake and south  to Plains on the Clark Fork.

Demographics

As of the census of 2000, there were 50 people, 18 households, and 12 families residing in the CDP. The population density was 1.0 people per square mile (0.4/km2). There were 22 housing units at an average density of 0.4/sq mi (0.2/km2). The racial makeup of the CDP was 56.00% White, 34.00% Native American, 2.00% from other races, and 8.00% from two or more races. Hispanic or Latino of any race were 4.00% of the population.

There were 18 households, out of which 33.3% had children under the age of 18 living with them, 50.0% were married couples living together, 11.1% had a female householder with no husband present, and 33.3% were non-families. 27.8% of all households were made up of individuals, and 11.1% had someone living alone who was 65 years of age or older. The average household size was 2.78 and the average family size was 3.50.

In the CDP, the population was spread out, with 30.0% under the age of 18, 8.0% from 18 to 24, 28.0% from 25 to 44, 22.0% from 45 to 64, and 12.0% who were 65 years of age or older. The median age was 36 years. For every 100 females, there were 85.2 males. For every 100 females age 18 and over, there were 105.9 males.

The median income for a household in the CDP was $29,583, and the median income for a family was $29,583. Males had a median income of $13,125 versus $17,083 for females. The per capita income for the CDP was $11,388. None of the population or the families were below the poverty line.

See also

 List of census-designated places in Montana

References

External links

Census-designated places in Montana
Census-designated places in Flathead County, Montana
Census-designated places in Sanders County, Montana